The 2008–09 Montreal Canadiens season was their 100th season and 92nd in the National Hockey League (NHL). While it was widely believed that the 2008–09 season marked the team's centennial, this would not be until the following season with the Canadiens' 100th anniversary taking place on December 4, 2009.

The 2008 NHL Entry Draft took place in Ottawa on June 20–21 and the free agency period began on July 1.

Off-season
Throughout much of the off-season, Canadiens' general manager Bob Gainey pursued a possible contract with unrestricted free agent Mats Sundin, formerly the captain of Montreal's historic rival, the Toronto Maple Leafs. The signing efforts started prior to July 1, 2008, and continued into August, as Gainey was still actively pursuing Sundin. This, despite the fact that Sundin's agent mentioned his player "wasn't close" to making a decision on his future, and was strongly considering retirement.
The chase ended with the acquisition of forward Robert Lang from the Chicago Blackhawks.

The Canadiens also acquired veteran forward Alex Tanguay from the Calgary Flames in exchange for the 25th overall pick in the 2007–2008 entry draft. Enforcer George Laraque and goaltender Marc Denis were signed to the team through free agency. Unrestricted free agents Michael Ryder, Mark Streit and Bryan Smolinski did not return to the team.

Preseason
The preseason schedule consisted of the team playing nine games in 13 days. The team claimed victory in six of these encounters.  The initial game of the pre-season was played against the Boston Bruins in Halifax, Nova Scotia. The Canadiens took part in the CBC's Kraft Hockeyville Series by playing a game against the Buffalo Sabres at the Sporting Centre Benoît Levesque in Roberval, Quebec.

Some noteworthy performances at the Canadiens training camp were put forth by prospects Max Pacioretty, Yannick Weber and Ben Maxwell.

Regular season

Early Centennial year celebrations

The team has announced its intention to retire two uniform numbers during the 2008–09 season. As of March 2009, the only confirmed number is Patrick Roy's number 33, which was retired on November 22, 2008.
In celebration of the Montreal Canadiens' centennial, the 2009 NHL All-Star Game was held in Montreal on January 25, 2009, and the 2009 NHL Entry Draft, scheduled for June 2009, was awarded to the city.

October

On October 10, the Canadiens embarked on a trip for three consecutive road games where they opened the season against the Buffalo Sabres, at the HSBC Arena.
Montreal lost the opening game of the season in shootout, but subsequently won 6–1 against the Toronto Maple Leafs on October 11 and 5–3 against the Philadelphia Flyers on October 13.
The team returned to Montreal after four days on the road and a 2–0–1 record. The Canadiens hosted the Boston Bruins for their 100th home opening game and won 4–3 in shootout, with Alex Tanguay scoring the winning goal.

On October 18, Saku Koivu achieved his 422nd assist with the Montreal Canadiens and surpassed Maurice "the Rocket" Richard at number seven for all-time assists in franchise history. Two days later, he got his 600th NHL career point when the Canadiens defeated the Florida Panthers 3–1.

According to a Forbes report published in late October 2008, the franchise ranks as the third most valuable in the NHL at US$334 million, making an 18% increase in the past season. The Toronto Maple Leafs and Detroit Red Wings were respectively ranked first and second in the report. The Canadiens finished October with a 7–1–1 record in Minnesota and concluded the month with two consecutive road wins and a perfect overall road record.

November
On November 1, against the New York Islanders, Andrei Markov became the second defenceman in franchise history, after Guy Lapointe, to get five points in his first five road games of the season. On November 10, the league announced that forward Tom Kostopoulos was suspended for three games after hitting Toronto Maple Leafs defenceman Mike Van Ryn from behind.
On November 11, Chris Higgins got his first NHL career hat-trick in a 4–0 win against the Ottawa Senators.
On November 22, the jersey number 33 of legendary goaltender Patrick Roy was retired.

On November 24, against the New York Islanders, Ryan O'Byrne scored on his own net during a delayed penalty call, where Carey Price was pulled off for an extra attacker. On November 29, Mike Komisarek—who was not playing due to injury—temporarily took a place behind the bench as an assistant coach, in replacement of Doug Jarvis, who was at his father's bedside.
Rookie right winger Matt D'Agostini was recalled from Hamilton Bulldogs of the American Hockey League (AHL) and Roman Hamrlik got his 400th NHL career assist in a 3–2 win over the Buffalo Sabres.

December
On December 2, Saku Koivu achieved his 612th point with the Montreal Canadiens after recording two assists in a 5–4 win over the Atlanta Thrashers. He tied Mats Naslund at 11th for all-time points in franchise history. Koivu then surpassed Naslund on December 6 after recording an assist in a 2–1 overtime loss over the New Jersey Devils. Matt D'Agostini scored his first NHL career goal and point and Roman Hamrlik played his 100th game with the club.

The Montreal Canadiens celebrated the 99th anniversary of the franchise on December 4 with a 6–2 win over the New York Rangers. Matt D'Agostini got his first NHL assist in a two-point performance. Georges Laraque got his first two points with his new team.
D'Agostini had a successful debut with the team, recording six goals and two assists in his first 11 games.
On December 13, Ben Maxwell played his first game in the NHL against the Washington Capitals after Saku Koivu was placed on the injured reserve list. On December 18, against the Philadelphia Flyers, Alexei Kovalev got his 900th NHL career point.

After the Christmas break, the Canadiens were back in action on the road on December 27 and won 3–2 against the Pittsburgh Penguins. The Montreal Canadiens enjoyed their 3000th franchise victory, with a 5–2 win over the Florida Panthers at Sunrise on December 29, solidifying their place as the most successful team in NHL history. Andrei Kostitsyn and Maxim Lapierre scored their first career hat-tricks during this road trip.

January
General Manager Bob Gainey presented his mid-season report on January 13. He stated that he was looking to improve the team's power play, which was 26th in the league, and he wanted to acquire a proven player capable of helping the power play. When asked by a reporter what was his best transaction since taking over as the team's general manager, he answered that the hiring of Guy Carbonneau as head coach was his best move.

February
In order to help bolster their power play, Bob Gainey acquired Matthieu Schneider from the Atlanta Trashers for a combination of draft picks. This is Schneider's second tenure with the Canadiens, who began his career in Montreal after being drafted by the team in 1987.

On February 17, Alexei Kovalev was asked by Managing Director Bob Gainey to go home and take a rest. He missed two games. There were rumors that he would be traded and the city was abuzz. Kovalev rejoined the team on February 21 and scored one goal and added two assists in a convincing 5–3 win over the Ottawa Senators. Kovalev received the first star of the game to the delight of the Montreal crowd.

A reporter for the Montreal newspaper La Presse stated on the evening of February 19 that the February 20 edition of the paper would have an exposé that would make the Kovalev situation seem inconsequential. The paper reported that Roman Hamrlik and brothers Andrei and Sergei Kostitsyn were involved with a person believed to be part of an organized crime ring in Montreal. Although the players have admitted that they know the person in question, no accusations nor proof has been provided indicating that the players were involved in any illegal activities. The article has since been written off as tabloid journalism and a major example on how the Montreal media negatively treat the Canadiens players.

On February 26, Gainey traded Steve Begin to the Dallas Stars for Doug Janik, who was immediately sent to the Hamilton Bulldogs. Begin, who was often a healthy scratch during the season, would have been an unrestricted free agent at the end of the season.

Saku Koivu scored his 624th point with the Canadiens with an assist in a February 27 game against the Philadelphia Flyers. He became the tenth all-time leading scorer in Canadiens history, surpassing Elmer Lach.

The Canadiens claimed Glen Metropolit off waivers from the Philadelphia Flyers on February 27. Metropolit was practicing with the Flyers earlier in the day when Flyers General Manager Paul Holmgren informed him, "I've got good news and bad news. The good news is that you're playing tonight. The bad news is that you're playing for the Canadiens." The Canadiens were in town playing the Flyers that same day and Metropolit simply moved his equipment to the visitor's dressing room.

March
Approaching the NHL trade deadline, Bob Gainey traded for Mathieu Schneider and claimed Glen Metropolit. Gainey confirmed that he couldn't risk trading away his young prospects for any "rental players."

On March 9, Gainey announced that he was replacing Guy Carbonneau as head coach until the end of the season. Don Lever was named assistant-coach.

Patrice Brisebois played his 1,000th NHL game on March 14 in a 3–2 loss to the New Jersey Devils. During that same game, Martin Brodeur tied the all-time NHL record for career wins with 551, tying Canadiens great Patrick Roy, who was in attendance at that game. Brodeur was given the first star of the game and received a standing ovation from his home province crowd.

Alex Tanguay scored a season-high five points (two goals and three assists) on March 24 in a 6–3 win against the Atlanta Thrashers at the Bell Centre.

Alexei Kovalev scored his 100th goal as a member of the Canadiens (and 23rd goal of the season) in a 4–1 win against the Chicago Blackhawks on March 31.

April
The Canadiens finished the regular season having tied the Carolina Hurricanes for the most power play opportunities, with 374.

Standings

Divisional standings

Conference standings

Schedule and results

|- align="center" bgcolor="#FFBBBB"
| September 22 || Montreal Canadiens || 3–8 || Boston Bruins|| Halifax, Nova Scotia || Halak, Denis || 10,595 || 0–1–0 || 
|- align="center" bgcolor="#CCFFCC"
| September 23 || Buffalo Sabres || 2–3 || Montreal Canadiens ||Roberval, Quebec || Denis || 1,000 || 1–1–0 || 
|- align="center" bgcolor="#CCFFCC"
| September 24 || Montreal Canadiens || 3–2 SO || Detroit Red Wings || Detroit, MI || Price, Desjardins || 15,319 || 2–1–0 ||  
|- align="center" bgcolor="#CCFFCC"
| September 26 || Ottawa Senators || 0–5 || Montreal Canadiens || Montreal || Halak || 21,273 || 3–1–0 || 
|- align="center" bgcolor="#FFBBBB"
| September 27 || Montreal Canadiens || 1–3 || Ottawa Senators || Kanata, Ontario ||Desjardins, Denis|| 20,282 || 3–2–0 || 
|- align="center" bgcolor="#CCFFCC"
| September 28 || Florida Panthers || 2–3 SO || Montreal Canadiens || Montreal || Halak || 21,273 || 4–2–0 || 
|- align="center" bgcolor="#CCFFCC"
| September 30 || Detroit Red Wings || 1–2 SO || Montreal Canadiens || Montreal || Price || 21,273 || 5–2–0 || 
|- align="center" bgcolor="#CCFFCC"
| October 1 || Boston Bruins || 1–3 || Montreal Canadiens || Montreal || Halak || 21,273 ||6–2–0 || 
|- align="center" bgcolor="#FFBBBB"
| October 4 || Minnesota Wild || 3–0 || Montreal Canadiens  || Montreal || Price || 21,273 ||6–3–0 ||  
|-

|- align="center" bgcolor="#ffffff"
| 1 || October 10 || Montreal Canadiens || 1–2 SO || Buffalo Sabres || Price || 18,690 || 0–0–1 || 1 || 
|- align="center" bgcolor="#CCFFCC"
| 2 || October 11 || Montreal Canadiens || 6–1 || Toronto Maple Leafs || Halak  || 19,370 || 1–0–1 || 3 || 
|- align="center" bgcolor="#CCFFCC"
| 3 || October 13 || Montreal Canadiens || 5–3 || Philadelphia Flyers || Price || 19,323 || 2–0–1 || 5 ||  
|- align="center" bgcolor="#CCFFCC"
| 4 || October 15 || Boston Bruins || 3–4 SO || Montreal Canadiens || Price || 21,273 || 3–0–1 || 7 || 
|- align="center" bgcolor="#CCFFCC"
| 5 || October 18 || Phoenix Coyotes || 1–4 || Montreal Canadiens || Price || 21,273 || 4–0–1 || 9 || 
|- align="center" bgcolor="#CCFFCC"
| 6 || October 20 || Florida Panthers || 1–3 || Montreal Canadiens || Halak || 21,273 || 5–0–1 || 11 || 
|- align="center" bgcolor="#FFBBBB"
| 7 || October 25 || Anaheim Ducks || 6–4 || Montreal Canadiens || Price* || 21,273 || 5–1–1 || 11 || 
|- align="center" bgcolor="#CCFFCC"
| 8 || October 28 || Carolina Hurricanes || 2–3 SO || Montreal Canadiens || Price || 21,273 || 6–1–1 || 13 || 
|- align="center" bgcolor="#CCFFCC"
| 9 || October 30 || Montreal Canadiens || 2–1 || Minnesota Wild || Price || 18,568 || 7–1–1 || 15 || 
|- align="center"
| colspan=10 | *Halak was replaced after the 4th goal by Anaheim. Price was credited with the decision as he let in the game winning 5th goal.
|-

|- align="center" bgcolor="#CCFFCC"
| 10 || November 1 || Montreal Canadiens || 5–4 || New York Islanders || Price || 14,429 || 8–1–1 || 17 || 
|- align="center" bgcolor="white"
| 11 || November 7 || Montreal Canadiens || 3–4 SO || Columbus Blue Jackets || Halak || 14,603 || 8–1–2 || 18 || 
|- align="center" bgcolor="#FFBBBB"
| 12 || November 8 || Montreal Canadiens || 3–6 || Toronto Maple Leafs || Price || 19,512 || 8–2–2 || 18 || 
|- align="center" bgcolor="#CCFFCC"
| 13 || November 11 || Ottawa Senators || 0–4 || Montreal Canadiens || Price || 21,273 || 9–2–2 || 20 || 
|- align="center" bgcolor="#FFBBBB"
| 14 || November 13 || Montreal Canadiens || 1–6 || Boston Bruins || Price || 16,816 || 9–3–2 || 20 || 
|- align="center" bgcolor="#FFBBBB"
| 15 || November 15 || Philadelphia Flyers|| 2–1 || Montreal Canadiens || Halak || 21,273 || 9–4–2 || 20 || 
|- align="center" bgcolor="#CCFFCC"
| 16 || November 16 || Montreal Canadiens || 3–2 SO || St. Louis Blues || Price || 19,150 || 10–4–2 || 22 || 
|- align="center" bgcolor="#FFBBBB"
| 17 || November 18 || Montreal Canadiens || 1–2 || Carolina Hurricanes || Price || 12,164 || 10–5–2 || 22 || 
|- align="center" bgcolor="#CCFFCC"
| 18 || November 20 || Montreal Canadiens || 3–2 SO || Ottawa Senators || Price || 20,475 || 11–5–2 || 24 || 
|- align="center" bgcolor="white"
| 19 || November 22 || Boston Bruins|| 3–2 SO || Montreal Canadiens || Price || 21,273 || 11–5–3 || 25 || 
|- align="center" bgcolor="white"
| 20 || November 24 || New York Islanders|| 4–3 SO || Montreal Canadiens || Price || 21,273 || 11–5–4 || 26 || 
|- align="center" bgcolor="#CCFFCC"
| 21 || November 26 || Montreal Canadiens || 3–1 || Detroit Red Wings || Price || 20,066 || 12–5–4 || 28 || 
|- align="center" bgcolor="#FFBBBB"
| 22 || November 28 || Montreal Canadiens || 0–3 || Washington Capitals || Halak || 18,277 || 12–6–4 || 28 || 
|- align="center" bgcolor="#CCFFCC"
| 23 || November 29 || Buffalo Sabres || 2–3 || Montreal Canadiens || Price || 21,273 || 13–6–4 || 30 || 
|- align="center"

|- align="center" bgcolor="#CCFFCC"
| 24 || December 2 || Atlanta Thrashers || 4–5 || Montreal Canadiens || Price || 21,273 || 14–6–4 || 32 || 
|- align="center" bgcolor="#CCFFCC"
| 25 || December 4 || New York Rangers|| 2–6 || Montreal Canadiens || Price || 21,273 || 15–6–4 ||34 || 
|- align="center" bgcolor="white"
| 26 || December 6 || New Jersey Devils|| 2–1 OT || Montreal Canadiens || Price || 21,273 || 15–6–5 || 35 || 
|- align="center" bgcolor="#CCFFCC"
| 27 || December 9 || Calgary Flames|| 1–4 || Montreal Canadiens || Halak || 21,273 || 16–6–5 || 37 || 
|- align="center" bgcolor="#FFBBBB"
| 28 || December 11 || Tampa Bay Lightning|| 3–1 || Montreal Canadiens || Halak || 21,273 || 16–7–5 || 37 || 
|- align="center" bgcolor="#FFBBBB"
| 29 || December 13 || Washington Capitals|| 2–1 || Montreal Canadiens || Halak || 21,273 || 16–8–5 || 37 || 
|- align="center" bgcolor="#FFBBBB"
| 30 || December 16 || Montreal Canadiens || 2–3 || Carolina Hurricanes || Halak || 16,434 || 16–9–5 || 37 || 
|- align="center" bgcolor="#CCFFCC"
| 31 || December 18 || Philadelphia Flyers || 2–5 || Montreal Canadiens || Halak || 21,273 || 17–9–5 || 39 || 
|- align="center" bgcolor="#CCFFCC"
| 32 || December 20 || Buffalo Sabres || 3–4 OT || Montreal Canadiens || Halak || 21,273 || 18–9–5 || 41 || 
|- align="center" bgcolor="white"
| 33 || December 21 || Carolina Hurricanes || 3–2 OT || Montreal Canadiens || Price || 21,273 || 18–9–6 || 42 || 
|- align="center" bgcolor="#CCFFCC"
| 34 || December 27 || Montreal Canadiens || 3–2 || Pittsburgh Penguins || Price || 17,132 || 19–9–6 || 44 || 
|- align="center" bgcolor="#CCFFCC"
| 35 || December 29 || Montreal Canadiens || 5–2 || Florida Panthers || Price || 20,741 || 20–9–6 || 46 || 
|- align="center" bgcolor="#CCFFCC"
| 36 || December 30 || Montreal Canadiens || 2–1 SO || Tampa Bay Lightning || Price || 20,454 || 21–9–6 || 48 || 
|- align="center"

|- align="center" bgcolor="#FFBBBB"
| 37 || January 2 || Montreal Canadiens || 1–4 || New Jersey Devils || Halak || 17,625 || 21–10–6 || 48 || 
|- align="center" bgcolor="#CCFFCC"
| 38 || January 4 || Florida Panthers|| 5–6 SO || Montreal Canadiens || Halak || 21,273 || 22–10–6 || 50 || 
|- align="center" bgcolor="#CCFFCC"
| 39 || January 7 || Montreal Canadiens || 6–3 || New York Rangers || Halak || 18,200 || 23–10–6 || 52 || 
|- align="center" bgcolor="#CCFFCC"
| 40 || January 8 || Toronto Maple Leafs|| 2–6 || Montreal Canadiens || Halak || 21,273 || 24–10–6 || 54 || 
|- align="center" bgcolor="#CCFFCC"
| 41 || January 10 || Washington Capitals|| 4–5 || Montreal Canadiens || Halak || 21,273 || 25–10–6 || 56 || 
|- align="center" bgcolor="#FFBBBB"
| 42 || January 13 || Montreal Canadiens || 1–3 || Boston Bruins || Halak || 17,565 || 25–11–6 || 56 || 
|- align="center" bgcolor="#CCFFCC"
| 43 || January 15 || Nashville Predators|| 2–3 || Montreal Canadiens || Halak  || 21,273 || 26–11–6 || 58 || 
|- align="center" bgcolor="#CCFFCC"
| 44 || January 17 || Montreal Canadiens || 5–4 SO || Ottawa Senators || Halak || 20,413 || 27–11–6 || 60 || 
|- align="center" bgcolor="#FFBBBB"
| 45 || January 20 || Montreal Canadiens || 2–4 || Atlanta Thrashers || Halak || 13,076 || 27–12–6 || 60 || 
|- align="center" bgcolor="#FFBBBB"
| 46 || January 21 || Montreal Canadiens || 2–5 || New Jersey Devils || Price || 16,235 || 27–13–6 || 60 || 
|- align="center" bgcolor="#FFBBBB"
| 47 || January 27 || Montreal Canadiens || 3–5 || Tampa Bay Lightning || Price || 15,912 || 27–14–6 || 60 || 
|- align="center" bgcolor="#FFBBBB"
| 48 || January 29 || Montreal Canadiens || 1–5 || Florida Panthers || Price || 16,334 || 27–15–6 || 60 || 
|- align="center" bgcolor="#CCFFCC"
| 49 || January 31 || Los Angeles Kings || 3–4 || Montreal Canadiens || Price || 21,273 || 28–15–6 || 62 || 
|- align="center"

|- align="center" bgcolor="#FFBBBB"
| 50 || February 1 || Boston Bruins || 3–1 || Montreal Canadiens || Price || 21,273 || 28–16–6 || 62 || 
|- align="center" bgcolor="#CCFFCC"
| 51 || February 3 || Pittsburgh Penguins|| 2–4 || Montreal Canadiens || Price || 21,273 || 29–16–6 || 64 || 
|- align="center" bgcolor="#FFBBBB"
| 52 || February 6 || Montreal Canadiens || 2–3 || Buffalo Sabres || Price || 18,161 || 29–17–6 || 64 || 
|- align="center" bgcolor="#FFBBBB"
| 53 || February 7 || Toronto Maple Leafs || 5–2 || Montreal Canadiens || Price || 21,273 || 29–18–6 || 64 || 
|- align="center" bgcolor="#FFBBBB"
| 54 || February 9 || Montreal Canadiens || 2–6 || Calgary Flames || Price || 19,289 || 29–19–6 || 64 || 
|- align="center"[nhl.com] bgcolor="#FFBBBB"
| 55 || February 11 || Montreal Canadiens || 2–7 || Edmonton Oilers || Price || 16,839 || 29–20–6 || 64 || 
|- align="center"[nhl.com] bgcolor="#CCFFCC"
| 56 || February 13 || Montreal Canadiens || 4–2 || Colorado Avalanche || Halak || 17,514 || 30–20–6  || 66 || 
|- align="center"[nhl.com] bgcolor="#FFBBBB"
| 57 || February 15 || Montreal Canadiens || 2–4 || Vancouver Canucks || Halak || 18,630 || 30–21–6 || 66 || 
|- align="center"[nhl.com] bgcolor="white"
| 58 || February 18 || Montreal Canadiens || 3–4 SO || Washington Capitals || Price || 18,277 || 30–21–7 || 67 || 
|- align="center"[nhl.com] bgcolor="#FFBBBB"
| 59 || February 19 || Montreal Canadiens || 4–5 || Pittsburgh Penguins || Price || 16,968 || 30–22–7 || 67 || 
|- align="center"[nhl.com] bgcolor="#CCFFCC"
| 60 || February 21 || Ottawa Senators || 3–5 || Montreal Canadiens || Halak || 21,273 || 31–22–7  || 69 || 
|- align="center"[nhl.com] bgcolor="#CCFFCC"
| 61 || February 24 || Vancouver Canucks || 0–3 || Montreal Canadiens || Halak || 21,273 || 32–22–7  || 71 || 
|- align="center"[nhl.com] bgcolor="#CCFFCC"
| 62 || February 27 || Montreal Canadiens || 4–3 OT || Philadelphia Flyers || Halak || 19,881 || 33–22–7 || 73 || 
|- align="center"[nhl.com] bgcolor="#CCFFCC"
| 63 || February 28 || San Jose Sharks || 2–3 || Montreal Canadiens || Halak || 21,273 || 34–22–7 || 75 || 
|- align="center"

|- align="center"[nhl.com] bgcolor="#FFBBBB"
| 64 || March 4 || Montreal Canadiens || 1–5 || Buffalo Sabres || Price || 18,690 || 34–23–7 || 75 || 
|- align="center"[nhl.com] bgcolor="#FFBBBB"
| 65 || March 6 || Montreal Canadiens || 0–2 || Atlanta Thrashers || Price || 14,900 ||34–24–7 || 75 || 
|- align="center"[nhl.com] bgcolor="#CCFFCC"
| 66 || March 8|| Montreal Canadiens || 3–1 || Dallas Stars || Price || 17,646 || 35–24–7|| 77 || 
|- align="center"[nhl.com] bgcolor="#CCFFCC"
| 67 || March 10|| Edmonton Oilers || 3–4 OT || Montreal Canadiens || Price || 21,273 || 36–24–7 || 79 || 
|- align="center" bgcolor="white"
| 68 || March 12|| New York Islanders || 3–2 OT  || Montreal Canadiens || Price ||  21,273 || 36–24–8 || 80 || 
|- align="center" bgcolor="#ffbbbb"
| 69 || March 14|| New Jersey Devils || 3–1 || Montreal Canadiens || Halak || 21,273 || 36–25–8 || 80 || 
|- align="center"
| 70 || March 17|| New York Rangers || 4–3 SO || Montreal Canadiens || Price || 21,273 || 36–25–9 || 81 || 
|- align="center" bgcolor="#ffbbbb"
| 71 || March 19|| Montreal Canadiens || 4–5 || Ottawa Senators || Halak || 20,500 || 36–26–9 || 81 || 
|- align="center" bgcolor="#ffbbbb"
| 72 || March 21|| Toronto Maple Leafs || 5–2 || Montreal Canadiens || Halak || 21,273 || 36–27–9 || 81|| 
|- align="center"[nhl.com] bgcolor="#CCFFCC"
| 73 || March 24|| Atlanta Thrashers || 3–6 || Montreal Canadiens || Price || 21,273 || 37–27–9 || 83 || 
|- align="center"[nhl.com] bgcolor="#CCFFCC"
| 74 || March 26|| Tampa Bay Lightning || 2–3 OT || Montreal Canadiens || Price || 21,273 || 38–27–9 || 85 || 
|- align="center"
| 75 || March 28|| Buffalo Sabres || 4–3 SO|| Montreal Canadiens || Price || 21,273 || 38–27–10 || 86 || 
|- align="center"[nhl.com] bgcolor="#CCFFCC"
| 76 || March 31|| Chicago Blackhawks || 1–4 || Montreal Canadiens || Price || 21,273 || 39–27–10  || 88 || 
|- align="center"

|- align="center" bgcolor="#CCFFCC"
| 77 || April 2 || Montreal Canadiens || 5–1 || New York Islanders || Halak || 15,255 || 40–27–10  || 90 ||
|- align="center" bgcolor="#CCFFCC"
| 78 || April 4 || Montreal Canadiens || 6–2 || Toronto Maple Leafs || Halak || 19,516 || 41–27–10 || 92 || 
|- align="center" bgcolor="#ffbbbb"
| 79 || April 6 || Ottawa Senators || 3–2 || Montreal Canadiens || Halak || 21,273 || 41–28–10 || 92 || 
|- align="center" bgcolor="#ffbbbb"
| 80 || April 7 || Montreal Canadiens || 3–1 || New York Rangers || Price || 18,200 || 41–29–10 || 92 || 
|- align="center"
| 81 || April 9 || Montreal Canadiens || 4–5 OT || Boston Bruins || Price || 17,565 || 41–29–11 || 93 || 
|- align="center" bgcolor="#ffbbbb"
| 82 || April 11 || Pittsburgh Penguins || 3–1 || Montreal Canadiens || Price || 21,273 || 41–30–11 || 93 || 
|- align="center"

|-
|Schedule

Playoffs
The Montreal Canadiens clinched a playoff spot following a 5–4 overtime loss against the Boston Bruins on April 9, 2008, their 81st game of the season.

Eastern Conference Quarterfinals: vs. (1) Boston Bruins
The Montreal Canadiens earned the No. 8 seed in the Eastern Conference by finishing with 93 points in the conference. With key players missing such as Andrei Markov, Mathieu Schneider, Alex Tanguay and Carey Price (who was struggling), they were swept in four games.

|-  align="center" bgcolor="#ffbbbb"
| 1 || April 16 || TD Banknorth Garden || Montreal || 2–4 || Boston Bruins || || Higgins, Kovalev || Kessel, Krejci, Chara (PP), Kessel (EN) || Thomas || 17,565 || Boston leads 1–0 || 
|-   align="center" bgcolor="#ffbbbb"
| 2 || April 18 || TD Banknorth Garden || Montreal || 1–5 || Boston Bruins || || Kovalev || Savard (PP), Kobasew, Hnidy, Savard (PP), Ryder (PP) || Thomas || 17,565 || Boston leads 2–0 || 
|- align="center" bgcolor="#ffbbbb"
| 3 || April 20 || Bell Centre || Boston Bruins || 4–2 || Montreal || || Higgins, Weber || Kessel, Thornton, Ryder, Kobasew (EN)|| Thomas ||21,273 ||Boston leads 3–0 || 
|- align="center" bgcolor="#ffbbbb"
| 4 || April 22 || Bell Centre || Boston Bruins || 4–1 || Montreal || || A. Kostitsyn || Ryder, Krejci, Kessel, Ryder || Thomas || 21,273 || Boston wins 4–0 || 
|-

* Player scoring winning goal is shown in italics.

Player statistics

Skaters
Note: GP = Games played; G = Goals; A = Assists; Pts = Points; +/− = Plus/minus; PIM = Penalty minutes

Goaltenders
Note: GP = Games played; TOI = Time on ice (minutes); W = Wins; L = Losses; OT = Overtime losses; GA = Goals against; GAA= Goals against average; SA= Shots against; SV= Saves; Sv% = Save percentage; SO= Shutouts

†Denotes player spent time with another team before joining Canadiens. Stats reflect time with Canadiens only.
‡Traded mid-season. Stats reflect time with Canadiens only.

Awards and records

Team awards
On April 11, following the final home game against the Pittsburgh Penguins, the team announced its award winners for the season.

National Hockey League Awards

All-Star Game

Elected to starting lineup
 Alexei Kovalev (RW) (Captain/Eastern Conference All-Star Team, All-Star Game MVP)
 Mike Komisarek (D)
 Andrei Markov (D)
 Carey Price (G)

Milestones

Transactions
The Canadiens have been involved in the following transactions during the 2008–09 season.

Trades

Free agent acquisitions

Players lost to free agency

Draft picks
Montreal's picks at the 2008 NHL Entry Draft in Ottawa, Ontario.

Broadcasting

Farm teams

Hamilton Bulldogs
The Hamilton Bulldogs remain Montreal's top affiliate in the American Hockey League in 2008–09.

Cincinnati Cyclones
Montreal continues their affiliation alongside the Nashville Predators for the Cincinnati Cyclones of the ECHL in 2008–09.

See also
 2008–09 NHL season
 Montreal Canadiens centennial

References

Montreal Canadiens seasons
M
M
National Hockey League All-Star Game hosts